Gouzeaucourt is a commune in the Nord department in northern France. It was the scene of fierce fighting during World War I, and is mentioned in the poem "The Irish Guards" by Rudyard Kipling. There are 916 casualties from several nations interred at the Gouzeaucourt New British Cemetery.

Heraldry

See also
Communes of the Nord department

References

External links

 

Communes of Nord (French department)